Vernonia missurica, the Missouri ironweed, is a species of magenta-flowered perennial plant from family Asteraceae native to the central and east central United States.

Description
The leaves are dark green in color and alternating.

The flowers of Vernonia missurica bloom in July and August and are magenta with reddish-brown bracts. Vernonia missurica has a central stout stem that is covered with white hairs, and the flowers grow close to each other and have rayless heads. Stems are hairy and reddish-brown.

Distribution 
Vernonia missurica is native to the central and east central United States namely Alabama, Arkansas, Georgia, Illinois, Indiana, Iowa, Kansas, Kentucky, Louisiana, Michigan, Mississippi, Missouri, Oklahoma, Tennessee, and Texas.

Habitat 
The species grows in river bottom woods, wet prairies, fens, and sedge meadows.

Ecology 
Vernonia missurica is typically visited by long-tongued bees, butterflies, and skippers. In the absence of these pollinators, the plant is capable of self-pollinating. It is pollinated by various bees such as members of the genus Bombus (bumblebees), the tribe Epeolini (epeoline cuckoo bees), the family Halictidae (halictid bees), and the genus Andrena (miner bees). Lepidoptera (butterflies), including those of the family Hesperiidae (skippers), are also frequent visitors. Some caterpillars feed on the plant, including the most common guests of Grammia parthenice (Parthenice tiger moth), Perigea xanthioides (red groundling), and Papaipema cerussata (ironweed borer moth). Herbivorous mammals avoid the plant due to its bitter taste.

References

missurica
Flora of the North-Central United States
Flora of the Southeastern United States
Flora of Texas
Flora of Indiana
Flora of Michigan
Plants described in 1833
Taxa named by Constantine Samuel Rafinesque